Iyad Mohammad al-Khatib (born 1974) is a Syrian politician. He has been Communications and Technology Minister since 26 November 2018.

Career 
Held numerous administrative positions including Director of Damascus Communications Branch, Head of Technical Department at the Syrian Telecommunications Establishment and Executive Managing Director of the Syrian Telecom.

In 2018, he was sanctioned by the European Union.

See also
 Second Hussein Arnous government

References 

Living people
Syrian ministers of communication
21st-century Syrian politicians
1974 births